Zuytdorp, also Zuiddorp (meaning "South Village", after Zuiddorpe, an extant village in the south of Zeeland in the Netherlands, near the Belgian border) was an 18th-century trading ship of the Dutch East India Company (Vereenigde Oost-Indische Compagnie, commonly abbreviated VOC).

On 1 August 1711, Zuytdorp was dispatched from the Netherlands to the trading port of Batavia (now Jakarta, Indonesia) bearing a load of freshly minted silver coins. Many trading ships travelled the Brouwer Route, using the strong Roaring Forties winds to carry them across the Indian Ocean to within sight of the west coast of Australia (then called New Holland), whence they would turn north towards Batavia.

Zuytdorp never arrived at its destination and was never heard from again. No search was undertaken, presumably because the VOC did not know whether or where the ship wrecked or if it was taken by pirates. Previous expensive attempts were made to search for other missing ships, but these failed even when an approximate wreck location was known.

This section of coastline, subsequently named the Zuytdorp Cliffs, was the preserve of Indigenous inhabitants and had been one of the last wildernesses until sheep stations were established there in the late 19th century. It has been speculated that survivors of the wreck may have traded with or intermarried with local Aboriginal communities between Kalbarri and Shark Bay.

There was news of an unidentified shipwreck on the shore in 1834 when Aboriginal people told a farmer near Perth about a wreck – the colonists presumed it was a recent wreck and sent rescue parties who failed to find the wreck or any survivors. In 1927, wreckage was seen by an Indigenous-European family group (Ada and Ernest Drage, Tom and Lurleen Pepper and Charlie Mallard) from a clifftop near the border of Murchison house and Tamala Stations. Tamala Station head stockman Tom Pepper reported the find to the authorities, with their first visit to the site occurring in 1941. In 1954 Pepper gave Phillip Playford directions to the wreckage. Playford identified the relics as from Zuytdorp.

The Western Australian Museum's work 
Investigations by the Western Australian Museum initially concentrated on recovering the silver deposits.  When salvage work ceased in 1981, a watch-keeper was appointed to guard the site.

Work recommenced in 1986 led by Mike McCarthy (with the Museum's chief diver Geoff Kimpton). Soon after the program entered a multi-disciplinary phase. Phillip Playford joined the salvage work, as did pre-historians including Kate Morse, terrestrial historical archaeologists including Fiona Weaver and Tom Pepper Jr., surveyors, the Department of Land Administration, and artists.  Oral histories were recorded with station identities, including relatives of the Pepper, Drage, Blood, Mallard and other Indigenous families involved with the wreck. Foremost in this new phase was the attention paid to the possibilities of European-Indigenous interaction and the movement of survivors away from the wreck. Phillip Playford's book, Carpet of Silver: The Wreck of the Zuytdorp was produced as part of the Museum's research.  The book won awards with reprint editions.

Historian Bill Bunbury reviewed the wreck and consequences in the chapter A Lost Ship – Lost People: The Zuytdorp Story in the book Caught in Time: Talking Australia History. 

The Museums in both Fremantle and at Geraldton presented exhibitions on the wreck, a website, and reports. An exhibition was also produced for the Kalbarri heritage centre. Due to the logistical difficulties and the advent of Health and Safety legislation, the Zuytdorp in-water program ceased in 2002, though work on land and in the laboratory remains active.

There was renewed interest in the authenticity of an inscription reading "Zuytdorp 1711" that was once visible on a rock-face adjacent to the reef platform at the site. Post-dating Phillip Playford's first visits in 1954/5, when photographs of the same area show no inscription, the inscription is considered a modern artefact. Details appear on Museum's reports series and Zuytdorp website.

Ernie Dingo visited the site to learn more about the estranged father Tom Pepper Jr and his grandparents Tom Snr and Lurlie Pepper. This investigation appeared in a 2018 edition of Who Do You Think You Are.

The site, one of the few restricted zones under the Commonwealth Historic Shipwrecks Act 1976, requires a permit to visit and remains under regular surveillance.

Dutch–Aboriginal intermarriage theory  
In 1988, an American woman who had married into the Mallard family contacted Phillip Playford and described how her husband had died some years before from a disease called variegate porphyria. Playford found that the disease was genetically linked and initially confined to Afrikaners and that all cases of the disease in South Africa were traceable to Gerrit Jansz and Ariaantjie Jacobs, who had married in Cape of Good Hope in 1688.

Zuytdorp arrived at the Cape in March 1712, where it took on more than 100 new crew. One of the Jansz' sons could have boarded the ship at this time and thus become the carrier of the disease into the Australian Aboriginal population. In 2002, a DNA investigation into the hypothesis that a variegate porphyria mutation was introduced into the Aboriginal population by shipwrecked sailors was undertaken at the Queen Elizabeth II Medical Centre in Nedlands, Western Australia, and the Stellenbosch University in South Africa. The research concluded the mutations were not inherited from shipwrecked sailors.

The presence of similar European genetic maladies in the Aboriginal population (such as Ellis–Van Creveld syndrome) as from VOC shipwreck survivors is also doubtful. Dutch–Indigenous links via the VOC wrecks are less plausible because of the importation of hundreds of divers for use in the Western Australian pearling field in the mid-to-late 19th century. Incorrectly called Malays, these indentured labourers came from the islands north of Australia, many via the port of Batavia. They boarded at Batavia where diseases (including genetic diseases) had been introduced by VOC personnel into the local population since 1600. In addition, many Malay pearlers remained on the coast and some intermarried with Aboriginal people at Shark Bay. Therefore, it is equally possible that genetic links between Aboriginal Australians and the Dutch can be traced to those sources. The possibility Aboriginal groups joined survivors from Zuytdorp or mutineers from Batavia inspired the Walga Rock ship painting was a popular belief. This theory has been challenged as new evidence points to the image being a steamship, possibly Xantho.

Commemorative plaque 
In June 2012, the Shire of Northampton unveiled a commemorative plaque in Kalbarri commemorating the 300th anniversary of Zuytdorp'''s wreck.

See also
 ANCODS, the Australian Netherlands Committee on Old Dutch Shipwrecks
 List of shipwrecks
 Concordia (1696 ship)
 Maritime archaeology
 Shipwrecks of Western Australia
 VOC ship Amsterdam
 Protected areas of Australia

Notes

References
 Playford, Phillip: Carpet Of Silver: The Wreck Of The Zuytdorp 1996, University Of Western Australia Press 
 Bunbury, Bill: Caught in Time - Talking Australian History 2006, Fremantle Arts Centre Press 
 Rupert Gerritsen, And their Ghosts May Be Heard'' 1994, Fremantle Arts Centre Press 
 McCarthy, M. (comp), 2002 Chronological Precis of events occurring in Stage 3 of the WA Museum at the Zuytdorp site(s). For the ANCODS meeting December 2002. Stage 1 – The Bingham/Kimpton era: 1969–71; Stage 2 – The Green era: 1971–1985; Stage 3 – The McCarthy/Kimpton era. With assistance from many expert practitioners and volunteers, including Prof Sandra Bowdler, Dr Richard Cassells, Mr Stanley Hewitt, Dr Kate Morse, Dr Phillip Playford, Mr Bob Sheppard, Staff of the Department of Land Administration, Mr Ross White, Ms Fiona Weaver. 1986–2002. Report – Department of Maritime Archaeology. Western Australian Maritime Museum, No. 173
 McCarthy, M., 2004: Zuytdorp. In J. Green, M. Gainsford and M. Stanbury, (Eds.) Department of Maritime Archaeology, Western Australian Maritime Museum: A compendium of projects, programs and publications. Australian National Centre of Excellence for Maritime Archaeology. Special Publication No.9: 65.
 McCarthy, M., 2006. The Dutch on Australian Shores: the Zuytdorp tragedy—unfinished business. In Shaw, L., and Wilkins, W., (eds.) Dutch Connections—400 years of Australian-Dutch maritime links. 1606-2006: 94-109. Reproduced as Department of Maritime Archaeology, Western Australian Museum, report No. 256 Zuytdorp: Unfinished business , M. McCarthy, 2009.

External links
 
  
 
 
 Western Australia Museum http://museum.wa.gov.au/maritime-archaeology-db/wrecks/id-811

Merchant ships of the Netherlands
Maritime incidents in 1712
Shark Bay
Ships of the Dutch East India Company
Shipwrecks of Western Australia
Australian Shipwrecks with protected zone